The Caterpillar D8 is a medium track-type tractor designed and manufactured by Caterpillar.  Though it comes in many configurations, it is usually sold as a bulldozer equipped with a detachable large blade and a rear ripper attachment.

History

1935: RD8 introduced.
1937: The "R" prefix dropped, D8 debuts.
1940s: D8 2U Series introduced
1950: D8 new front-rounded grill that would last until D8K was replaced by D8L in 1982.
1955: 1H Series D8 ends production;  D8E and D8D introduced with new  displacement (CID) D342 diesel engine. D8D had a torque converter and D8E had a direct drive transmission.
1956: D8D replaced by D8G.
1956: D8E replaced by D8F.
1958:  D8H introduced.
1965: Power increased to 
1970: D8 46a 48a power increased 
1974:  D8K replaced the D8H.
1982:  D8L replaced D8K. The D8L was the first D8 with the elevated drive sprocket undercarriage.
1984: D8L SA (special application) for farming applications premiers. Available with a three point hitch, for mounted implements.
1987: D8N with differential steer transmission, the first track-type Caterpillar tractor to have one.
1996:  D8R replaced D8N.
2000: D8R Series 2 replaced the D8R.
2004:  D8T ACERT replaced D8R Series 2.

Blades
Several types of bulldozer blade can be used on the front of the tractor:
 Straight ("S-Blade"): A short blade with no lateral curve and no side wings.  It can be used for fine grading
 Angle: held by a U shape frame that has three holes on each side, to set the blade to 3 positions: right, center, and left.
 Universal ("U-Blade"): A tall and very curved blade with large side wings to carry more material
 "S-U" combination: A shorter blade with less curvature and smaller side wings

Other blade types include landfill U-Blades, woodchip U-blades, and two-way blades for work inside the holds of ships.

See also
 Heavy equipment
 G-numbers U.S. Army Cats
 Caterpillar D9
 Caterpillar D7
 List of Caterpillar Inc. machines
 Bob Semple tank

References

 SNL G153 heavy tractor

External links
Caterpillar D-Series Track-Type Tractors - Official Caterpillar website
Caterpillar D8R Series II Track Type Tractor, (Bit-Ends, Edge-Cuttings, Protector and Tip Ripper

Caterpillar Inc. vehicles
Tractors
Tracked vehicles